The second season of the Japanese anime television series Gin Tama are directed by Shinji Takamatsu and animated by Sunrise. They aired in TV Tokyo from April 5, 2007, until March 27, 2008, with a total of 50 episodes which are episodes 51–99 from the main series. The anime is based on Hideaki Sorachi's manga of the same name. The story revolves around an eccentric samurai, Gintoki Sakata, his apprentice, Shinpachi Shimura, and a teenage alien girl named Kagura. All three are "free-lancers" who search for work in order to pay the monthly rent, which usually goes unpaid anyway.

In Japan, Aniplex distributes the anime in DVD format. The second season was released over thirteen volumes between July 25, 2007 and July 23, 2008. 

On January 8, 2009, the streaming video site Crunchyroll began offering English subtitled episodes of the series. The episodes are available on Crunchyroll within hours of airing in Japan to paying members. The episodes can also be watched for free a week after release. The first available episode was episode 139. On the same day, Crunchyroll also began uploading episodes from the beginning of the series at a rate of two a week.

Six musical themes are used for this season: two openings themes and four ending themes. Episodes 50-75 use  by redballoon. It is used until episode 75, while since episode 76 the ending is "Signal" by Kelun. The fourth ending used since episode 88 is "Speed of flow" by The Rodeo Carburettor. Episodes 61, 62, 97 and 99 exchange the use of the themes; this leaves episode 61 and 62 with "Shura" as the opening and with "Gin'iro Sora" as the ending while "Speed of flow" and "Kasanaru Kage" are opening and ending themes, respectively, in episodes 97 and 99. Episode 96 does not use an opening theme, while "Kasanaru Kage" is used as an ending theme.



Episode list

References
General

Specific

2007 Japanese television seasons
2008 Japanese television seasons
Season 2